The Criminal Procedure Act 1853 (16 & 17 Vict c 30) is an Act of the Parliament of the United Kingdom. It makes provision for the giving of evidence by prisoners otherwise than at their own trial.

Preamble 
The preamble was repealed by the Statute Law Revision Act 1892.

Sections 1 to 8 
Section 1 was repealed by section 1 of, and the Schedule to, the Act 24 & 25 Vict c 95. It is replaced by section 43 of the Offences against the Person Act 1861.

Section 2 was repealed by section 56(4) of, and Part IV of Schedule 11 to, the Courts Act 1971.

Sections 3 to 8 were repealed by the Statute Law Revision Act 1892.

Section 9 – Bringing up a prisoner to give evidence 

The words "One of Her Majesty's Principal Secretaries of State, or" in the first place were repealed by section 15 of, and the Schedule to, the Prison Act 1898.

The words "or Common Pleas, or any Baron of the Exchequer" in the second place were repealed by the Statute Law Revision Act 1892.

"High Court"

According to legislation.gov.uk these words were substituted by 224(1) of Supreme Court of Judicature (Consolidation) Act 1925. Halsbury's Statutes has the words "Court of Queen's Bench" instead. The jurisdiction of that court is now vested in the High Court.

"The Royal Courts of Justice"

According to legislation.gov.uk these words were substituted by 224(1) of Supreme Court of Judicature (Consolidation) Act 1925. Halsbury's Statutes has the word "Westminster" instead.

Section 10 – Extent of Act 

This section provided that this Act did not extend to Scotland or Ireland.

In the United Kingdom, the reference to Ireland must now be construed as a reference to Northern Ireland.

See also 
Criminal Procedure Act

References 
Halsbury's Statutes,
John Mounteney Lely. "The Criminal Procedure Act, 1853". The Statutes of Practical Utility. (Chitty's Statutes). Fifth Edition. Sweet and Maxwell. Stevens and Sons. London. 1894. Volume 3. Title "Criminal Law". Pages 85 to 87.
William Paterson (ed). "Aggravated Assaults Act". The Practical Statutes of the Session 1853. John Crockford. Essex Street, Strand, London. 1853. Pages 25 to 30.

External links 
The Criminal Procedure Act 1853, as amended from the National Archives.
The Criminal Procedure Act 1853, as originally enacted from the National Archives.

United Kingdom Acts of Parliament 1853